
Gmina Ostrów Lubelski is an urban-rural gmina (administrative district) in Lubartów County, Lublin Voivodeship, in eastern Poland.

Neighbouring gminas
Gmina Ostrów Lubelski is bordered by the gminas of Ludwin, Niedźwiada, Parczew, Serniki, Spiczyn and Uścimów.

Villages
The gmina contains the following villages having the status of sołectwo: Bójki, Jamy, Kaznów, Kaznów-Kolonia, Kolechowice Drugie, Kolechowice Pierwsze, Kolechowice-Folwark, Kolechowice-Kolonia, Rozkopaczew (sołectwos: Rozkopaczew I and Rozkopaczew II), Rudka Kijańska and Wólka Stara Kijańska.

Demography

Area 
It spans an area of 121.7 square kilometers, including:

 Agricultural area: 68%
 Forest area: 18%

References

Polish official population figures 2006

Ostrow Lubelski
Lubartów County